Peter Somers (3 June 1878 – 27 November 1914) was a Scottish footballer who played as an inside forward for Celtic, Blackburn Rovers, Hamilton Academical and Scotland. Somers also played for the Scottish Football League XI three times. After retiring as a player, Somers became a director of Hamilton Academical.

His son Billy Somers, also a footballer, was a Dominion of Canada Football Champion with Toronto Scottish in 1932. Another son John played briefly for Hearts.

Honours
Celtic
Scottish Division One: 1904–05, 1905–06, 1906–07, 1907–08, 1908–09
Scottish Cup: 1903–04, 1906–07, 1907–08
Glasgow Cup: 1904–05, 1905–06, 1906–07, 1907–08
Glasgow Merchants Charity Cup: 1902–03

Notes

References

Sources

External links

1878 births
1914 deaths
Scottish footballers
Scotland international footballers
People from Strathaven
Footballers from South Lanarkshire
Association football inside forwards
Celtic F.C. players
Scottish Junior Football Association players
Blackburn Rovers F.C. players
Hamilton Academical F.C. players
Clyde F.C. players
Scottish Football League players
English Football League players
Scottish Football League representative players
Hamilton Academical F.C. non-playing staff